Shabby Tiger is a 1934 novel by the British writer Howard Spring. It was followed by a sequel Rachel Rosing in 1935.

A millionaire's son chooses to become an artist at the height of the Great Depression.

Adaptation
In 1973 it was made into a television series Shabby Tiger broadcast on ITV and starring John Nolan and Prunella Gee.

References

Bibliography
 John Finch, Michael Cox & Marjorie Giles Granada Television--The First Generation. Manchester University Press, 2003.

1934 British novels
Novels by Howard Spring
British novels adapted into television shows
Novels set in Manchester
William Collins, Sons books